Egesina tsushimae is a species of beetle in the family Cerambycidae. It was described by Stephan von Breuning and Ohbayashi in 1964.

References

Egesina
Beetles described in 1964